Douglas Black may refer to:

 Sir Douglas Black (physician) (1913–2002), British physician
 Douglas Black (publisher) (1895–1977), American lawyer and publishing house executive
 Doug Black (born 1952), Canadian politician and lawyer